Francis Pym (27 October 1756 – 4 December 1833) was a British M.P. and High Sheriff.

Biography

Francis was the son of William Pym and Elizabeth née Kingsley and lived at the family seat of Hasells Hall (which he considerably improved) in Sandy, Bedfordshire.

He was a Whig Member of Parliament for Bedfordshire from 1806 to 1818, and from 1820 to 1826. He was also High Sheriff of Bedfordshire in 1791.

He married Anne Palmer in 1784; they had four sons: Francis, Revd William Wollaston, Robert and Charles and two daughters Anne and Catherine who all survived them, and two sons who did not, one having died in infancy and the other, John, a lieutenant in the 13th Light Dragoons, having been killed at the Battle of Waterloo.

He was the great-great-great-grandfather of Francis Leslie Pym.

He is buried in Sandy, Bedfordshire with a monument sculpted by Thomas Denman.

Hasells Hall
Pym rebuilt the family's seat Hasells Hall (also known as Hazells Hall) located outside Sandy towards Everton. It is a Grade II listed manor house, with grounds designed by Humphry Repton.

References

1756 births
1833 deaths
Members of the Parliament of the United Kingdom for English constituencies
High Sheriffs of Bedfordshire
People from Sandy, Bedfordshire
UK MPs 1806–1807
UK MPs 1807–1812
UK MPs 1812–1818
UK MPs 1820–1826
Burials in Bedfordshire